Cirrhia is a genus of moths of the family Noctuidae.

References
Natural History Museum Genus Details

Cuculliinae